Vriesea mitoura is a plant species in the genus Vriesea. This species is native to Venezuela.

References

mitoura
Flora of Venezuela